Illatila is a monotypic snout moth genus described by Harrison Gray Dyar Jr. in 1914. It contains the species Illatila gurbyris, which is found in Panama.

References

Phycitinae
Monotypic moth genera
Moths of Central America